Philippines women's junior national softball team is the junior national team for the Philippines. The team competed at the 1991 ISF Junior Women's World Championship in Adelaide, Australia where they had 0 wins and 11 losses.  The team competed at the 2003 ISF Junior Women's World Championship in Nanjing, China where they finished ninth.

References

External links 
 International Softball Federation

Softball
Women's national under-18 softball teams
Softball in the Philippines
Youth sport in the Philippines